Haruo Satō may refer to:

, Japanese novelist
, Japanese voice actor
, Japanese water polo player